Alison Natalie Kay Lowe  is a British Labour politician and deputy mayor of West Yorkshire for Policing and Crime. She was the first black woman Leeds city councillor, serving from 1990 to 2019, and has served as the chief executive of Touchstone, a mental health charity based in Leeds, from 2004 to 2021.

Lowe won the 2014 Forward Business Woman of the Year award and Stonewall Senior Champion of the Year in 2015.

Personal life

Lowe was born in September 1964. Her father had emigrated to Leeds from St Kitts in 1956 and her Leeds-born mother, Kay, was of Irish descent. Her mother became pregnant with Lowe at 20 years old and was subsequently evicted from her family home.

Lowe was raised with her three siblings in Seacroft and attended Parklands Girls High School. After marrying at 20 years old, she had two children at 21 and 23. Her eldest child is poet and writer Adam Lowe. Lowe and her family participated in the ITV fly-on-the-wall documentary, Family Life, in 1999.

She studied history at the University of Leeds, beginning her undergraduate degree three weeks after the birth of her second child in 1987. Following the completion of a thesis on Edward II of England in 1990, entitled "Homosexuality in the Middle Ages", Lowe later graduated with a master's degree in medieval studies in 1993.

Career
Whilst studying at university, Lowe was elected to Leeds City Council to represent Armley ward in 1990, thus becoming first black woman councillor to serve on the council. She held multiple positions during her time in office, including Deputy Lord Mayor, an executive member (sitting on the council's ruling cabinet) and chair of the West Yorkshire Police and Crime Panel (overseeing the work of West Yorkshire Police).

Alongside her commitments as a Leeds city councillor, Lowe worked for numerous homelessness charities before, in 2004, she became CEO of Touchstone, a Leeds-based mental health charity. In May 2021, Lowe handed in her three-months notice after being CEO of Touchstone for over 17 years and announced she would step down as to become the deputy mayor Policing and Crime of West Yorkshire.

After 29 years' continuous service as a councillor, she retired from the council at the 2019 election and, in 2020, was made an honorary alderwoman of Leeds. One of her first roles in this capacity was to chair a review of statues in the city in response to criticisms of the city's statuary in connection with the Black Lives Matter movement.

She previously attempted to become a Labour Party prospective parliamentary candidate on multiple occasions but was never selected by a Constituency Labour Party. She was shortlisted but lost the Leeds North East candidate selection for the 1997 general election to Liz Davies. Ahead of the 2010 election, Rachel Reeves beat Lowe for Leeds West, despite Lowe being a local councillor within the constituency. Most recently, before the 2015 election, Jo Cox was selected over Lowe for Batley and Spen, although Lowe lived in Birstall in the constituency.

On 12 May 2021, Lowe was appointed as the inaugural deputy mayor of West Yorkshire for Policing and Crime by the first West Yorkshire Mayor Tracy Brabin. The role was officially confirmed on 18 June 2021.

Lowe was appointed Officer of the Order of the British Empire (OBE) in the 2022 New Year Honours for services to mental health and wellbeing during Covid-19. 

In July 2022, Lowe was awarded an honorary Doctorate of Laws by the University of Leeds, on the basis of "Alison’s personal commitment to speaking up for the marginalised and to promoting the importance of frank and open discussion about mental health extends into her professional commitments."

Notes

References

External links
 Official webpage

Living people
Alumni of the University of Leeds
Councillors in Leeds
Labour Party (UK) councillors
1964 births
Black British women politicians
People from Seacroft
Women councillors in England
Officers of the Order of the British Empire